This is the discography of British folk punk band the Men They Couldn't Hang.

Albums

Studio albums

Live albums

Compilation albums

Video albums

EPs

Singles

References

Discographies of British artists
Rock music group discographies
Folk music discographies